Aphnaeus argyrocyclus, the rare silver spot, is a butterfly in the family Lycaenidae. It is found in Ivory Coast, Ghana, Nigeria (the eastern part of the country and the Cross River loop), Cameroon, Gabon, the Republic of the Congo, the Central African Republic, the Democratic Republic of the Congo (Équateur, Tshopo and Maniema), Uganda and north-western Tanzania. The habitat consists of forests.

The larvae feed on Alchornea cordifolia.

References

External links
Die Gross-Schmetterlinge der Erde 13: Die Afrikanischen Tagfalter. Plate XIII 69 c as Aphnaeus propinquus Holland, 1893 (synonym)

Butterflies described in 1890
Aphnaeus
Butterflies of Africa